Birsa Munda Hockey Stadium or Ranchi Hockey Stadium is a field hockey stadium in Ranchi, Jharkhand. It serves as the home ground for Hockey India League franchise Ranchi Rays.

It is located in Morabadi near Ranchi and has a capacity of approximately 5000. This was also the home ground of Hockey India League team Ranchi Rhinos.

Initially built in 1990 then subsequently renovated. It is believed to be the newest and best stadium in India. It was inaugurated by then Governor of Jharkhand K Sankaranarayanan as a prelude to the 34th National Games scheduled to be organized in Jharkhand from 21 November 2009.

The stadium was constructed at a cost of around Rs 7 crore. It has a floodlight facility for day and night matches, a huge screen for live telecast of events and an electronic score board. The astro turf has been imported from Germany.

See also
Hockey India League

References

External links
 Hockey Jharkhand - Official Website

Sports venues in Jharkhand
Sport in Ranchi
Sports venues in Ranchi
Field hockey venues in India
Memorials to Birsa Munda
Sports venues completed in 1991
1991 establishments in Bihar
20th-century architecture in India